Natasha Parry (2 December 1930 – 22 July 2015) was an English actress of Russian descent. The daughter of film director Gordon Parry, she was married to theatre director Peter Brook from 1951 until her death, and is the mother of filmmakers Irina Brook and Simon Brook.

Early life
Born in London, Parry was the daughter of the Anglo-Greek film director Gordon Parry and his Russian wife. (Some sources say Gordon Parry was her stepfather.)

Stage
Parry made her stage debut at age 12 in The Wingless Victory. At 14, she was in A Midsummer Night's Dream, and later she played in Big Ben and Bless the Bride. On Broadway she appeared in The Fighting Cock (1959–1960). Toward the end of her career, she was in The Tragedy of Hamlet at the Young Vic in London.

Film
Parry made her screen debut in Dance Hall (1950). She appeared in many of her husband's productions including a live American television version of King Lear (1953) opposite Orson Welles, in Anouilh's The Fighting Cock with Rex Harrison, Meetings with Remarkable Men, The Cherry Orchard, and Happy Days.

Personal life
Parry was out from performing for a year after contracting tuberculosis in 1952.

Marriage
In 1951, she married director Peter Brook at the Russian Orthodox Cathedral of the Dormition of the Mother of God and All Saints, Ennismore Gardens, Knightsbridge, London. The couple had two children, Irina and Simon.

Death
Parry died on 22 July 2015 (Some sources say 23 July 2015) while on holiday in La Baule, Brittany, France, at the age of 84 after a stroke.

Filmography

Selected television

 Sir Francis Drake – The Prisoner (1961) as Countess Inez

 The Count of Monte Cristo (1964) as Mercédès

Selected theatre
 King Lear (1953)
 Tchin-Tchin (1984, Théâtre des Bouffes du Nord, Paris)

References

External links
 
 

1930 births
2015 deaths
Actresses from London
English film actresses
English television actresses
English people of Greek descent
Brook family